Lalden is a railway station in the Swiss canton of Valais and municipality of Lalden. The station is located on the Lötschberg line of the BLS AG. The station is closed until 2022 because of track work on the railway line.

The station is served by the following passenger train:

Lalden station is an intermediate point of the Lötschberg South Ramp walking trail, which parallels the south ramp of the Lötschberg railway as it descends the northern flank of the Rhone valley into Brig.

References

External links 
 
 

Railway stations in the canton of Valais
BLS railway stations